Joey Jacobs (born 10 April 2000) is a Dutch professional footballer who plays as a defender for Eerste Divisie club Almere City.

Club career
He made his Eerste Divisie debut for Jong AZ on 12 October 2018 as a second-half substitute in a 2–2 draw with Jong FC Utrecht.

On 11 January 2022, Jacobs signed a 2.5-year contract with Almere City.

International career
He has played internationally for the Netherlands at under-15, under-16, under-18 and under-20 level.

Personal life
He is the brother of fellow professional footballer Jamie Jacobs.

References

External links
 
 

Living people
2000 births
People from Purmerend
Association football defenders
Dutch footballers
Jong AZ players
Almere City FC players
Eerste Divisie players
Netherlands youth international footballers
Footballers from North Holland